Ouvrage Col de Buffere is a lesser work (petit ouvrage) of the Maginot Line's Alpine extension, the Alpine Line. Additional blocks were planned but not built or were left incomplete.

Description
See Fortified Sector of the Dauphiné for a broader discussion of the Dauphiné sector of the Alpine Line.
Block 1 (entry): one Machine gun turret and two machine gun embrasures.
Block 2 (unbuilt): one heavy twin machine gun embrasure. The block was never built, and consists of a simple wood door in a concrete frame leading to the galleries within the cliffside.
Block 3 (uncompleted): one machine gun embrasure. The block was never built, and consists of a simple wood door in a concrete frame leading to the galleries within the cliffside.
A small emergency exit exists at the southern end of the underground gallery, armed with a machine gun port.

See also 
 List of Alpine Line ouvrages

References

Bibliography 
Allcorn, William. The Maginot Line 1928-45. Oxford: Osprey Publishing, 2003. 
Kaufmann, J.E. and Kaufmann, H.W. Fortress France: The Maginot Line and French Defenses in World War II, Stackpole Books, 2006. 
Kaufmann, J.E., Kaufmann, H.W., Jancovič-Potočnik, A. and Lang, P. The Maginot Line: History and Guide, Pen and Sword, 2011. 
Mary, Jean-Yves; Hohnadel, Alain; Sicard, Jacques. Hommes et Ouvrages de la Ligne Maginot, Tome 4 - La fortification alpine. Paris, Histoire & Collections, 2009.  
Mary, Jean-Yves; Hohnadel, Alain; Sicard, Jacques. Hommes et Ouvrages de la Ligne Maginot, Tome 5. Paris, Histoire & Collections, 2009.

External links 
 Col de la Buffère (petit ouvrage du) at fortiff.be 
 

COLB
Maginot Line
Alpine Line
Fortifications of Briançon